David Reese or Reece may refer to:
 David Reece, lead singer of German heavy metal band Accept, Bangalore Choir, and Gypsy Rose
 David Reece (priest) (1895–1981), Archdeacon of Margam
 David Addison Reese (1794–1871), American politician and doctor
 David Meredith Reese (1800–1861), American physician and skeptic
 Dave Reece (born 1948), American professional ice hockey goaltender
 Chip Reese (1951–2007), American professional gambler

See also
David Rees (disambiguation)